Gapon may refer to:
Georgy Gapon (1870–1906), Russian Orthodox priest
Yevgeni Gapon (b. 1991), Russian association football player
Gapon, nickname of Jovan Grković (1879–1912), Serbian Orthodox monk and chetnik
Gapon, a colloquial form of the Russian male first name Agafon
Gafon, a diminutive of the Russian male first name Agafonik